Dennis E. Butler (born 9 February 1940) is an American politician.

Butler was born to E. A. and Elizabeth Butler on 9 February 1940. The family moved from his birthplace in Lenox, Iowa, to Council Bluffs, where he graduated from Abraham Lincoln High School 1958. Butler then earned a bachelor's degree in political science from the University of Missouri in 1962. After serving in the United States Navy for four years, Butler obtained his certification as a teacher in 1969 at the University of Nebraska–Omaha. He taught social studies and debate at schools in Council Bluffs. In 1972, Butler was elected to the Iowa House of Representatives. He was affiliated with the Republican Party and represented District 99 for a single term.

References

1940 births
University of Nebraska Omaha alumni
People from Lenox, Iowa
Living people
Republican Party members of the Iowa House of Representatives
20th-century American politicians
Schoolteachers from Iowa
20th-century American educators
University of Missouri alumni
United States Navy sailors
Politicians from Council Bluffs, Iowa